India is a feminine given name derived from the name of the country India, which itself takes its name from the Indus River. The name was used for India Wilkes, a character in the novel and film Gone with the Wind. Its use for girls in England began during the British rule in India during the 19th century. It has been used for daughters of aristocratic families in England that had ties to Colonial India, such as India Hicks. It has had an exotic image in the Anglosphere and also is similar in sound to other fashionable names such as Olivia and Sophia. In more recent years, some critics have viewed use of the name for non-Indian girls as problematic because they say it evokes the British Raj and colonialism. Although India is a feminine given name in the world, it is not a popular given name in India.

Usage
The name has been used in the Anglosphere since at least the 19th century. In the United States it ranked among the top 1,000 names for girls at different points between 1880 and 1911. It then declined in use but has had renewed popularity beginning in 1970 and was again among the 1,000 most popular names for American girls at different points between 1970 and 2021. It has been among the 200 most popular names for girls in the United Kingdom since 1996 and among the 100 most popular names for girls in Spain since 2017.

People named India
India Adams (1927-2020), American singer
India Allen (born 1965), American Playboy model
India Arie (born 1975), American singer-songwriter 
India de Beaufort (born 1987), English actress
India Jane Birley (born 1961),  British artist and businesswoman
India Boyer (1907-1998), American architect
India Catalina (fl. early 16th century), local translator/intermediary for Pedro de Heredia in the Spanish conquest of Colombia 
India Crago Harris, American diplomat, lawyer, and patron of the arts
India Edwards (1895-1990), American journalist and political advisor
India Eisley (born 1993), American actress
India Ennenga (born 1994), American actress
India Fisher (born 1974), British actress, narrator and presenter
India Grey, British romance novelist
India Hair (born 1987), French actress of American-English parentage
India Hicks (born 1967), British designer, writer, businesswoman, and former fashion model 
India Rose Hemsworth (born 2012), daughter of famous actor Chris Hemsworth 
India Jane Birley (born 1961), British artist, heiress, and businesswoman
India Knight (born 1965), British journalist and author 
India Oxenberg (born 1991), American film producer
India Scandrick, American actress
India Summer, American pornographic actress 
India Trotter (born 1985), American former professional soccer player
India Walton (born 1982), former mayoral candidate in Buffalo, New York
India Willoughby, English journalist and newsreader

Animals named India
India "Willie" Bush, a cat owned by former U.S. President George W. Bush and First Lady Laura Bush

Fictional characters named India
India, character in Shalimar the Clown
India the Moonstone Fairy, character in the Rainbow Magic book franchise
India Bridge, character in the 1990 film Mr. and Mrs. Bridge
India Cohen, minor character in Buffy the Vampire Slayer
India Jourdain, an antagonist character in the TV series Jane by Design
India McCray, character in 1981 horror/psychological thriller book The Elementals by Michael McDowell
India Opal, character in the book Because of Winn-Dixie
India Stoker, character in the 2013 film Stoker
India Tate, character in the 1983 novel Voice of Our Shadow by Jonathan Carroll
India Wilkes, character in the book Gone with the Wind

India as a family name
People with the surname India include:
Jaclyn Sienna India, American luxury travel advisor
Jonathan India, American baseball player

Notes

Feminine given names
English given names